Roeland Pruijssers (born 16 August 1989) is a Dutch chess grandmaster.

Chess career
Born in 1989, Pruijssers earned his international master title in 2007 and his grandmaster title in 2012. He won the Leiden Open in 2016, scoring 7/9. He is the No. 13 ranked Dutch player as of June 2021.

References

External links

1989 births
Living people
Chess grandmasters
Dutch chess players
Sportspeople from Hendrik-Ido-Ambacht